Elections to the Senate of the Democratic Republic of the Congo were held on 19 January 2007, though they had originally been scheduled for 16 January. The members of the Senate were chosen through indirect election by the members of the provincial assemblies; the delay was a result of the difficulties in choosing traditional chiefs to fill the places reserved for them in the provincial assemblies.

Results
Bemba, who had placed second in the 2006 presidential election, won a Senate seat from the capital, Kinshasa.

References

Elections in the Democratic Republic of the Congo
DR Congo
Senate election